Raynes Birkbeck (born 1956) is an American artist who lives and works in Manhattan. Birkbeck is a self-taught artist who paints, sculpts, draws, and writes poetry.

Life and work 
Birkbeck was born in The Bronx, NY.

He has exhibited work at the Bureau of General Services—Queer Division, New York, Situations, New York; and Safe Gallery, Brooklyn.

Willow Glen Films is producing a documentary on Raynes, in conjunction with his exhibition at Nino Mier Gallery, LA.

References 

1956 births
African-American painters
American male painters
Living people
People from the Bronx
21st-century African-American people
20th-century African-American people